Xana Morris, known professionally as Xana, is a Canadian pop musician.

Early life 
Xana grew up in a music-loving family on Vancouver Island. At age 5, Xana took violin lessons, and at 10, she took vocal lessons.

Career
In 2015, Xana formed an acoustic pop-punk duo, Coffee Eyes, with Joel Cossette. When the duo broke up, Xana took at two-year educational program, during which time she avoided writing. In 2018, two months after her program ended, she went to work in order to later make music a financially viable career. She wrote what was to be her third solo single, "Tipsy", during the gap between school and work. She continued to write music for the next two years, although she would only begin recording in 2020.

Xana debuted solo with the single "Goddess" in 2020. The song serves as a statement as to who she is as an artist and the space she'll take up in the industry. Asked why the song uses male pronouns, despite Xana identifying as a lesbian, Xana explained that "the song speaks to many different situations, personal or otherwise. It was a fuck-you to those people who think they can walk all over you and take whatever they want. With everything that I was dealing with personally and seeing around me in the music industry, the use of “he” pronouns reflected those experiences." Due to the COVID-19 pandemic, which struck right before her planned debut, Xana primarily promoted her music through TikTok.

Xana subsequently released singles "Pray", "Tipsy", "Yellow", and "Kitchen Light". 

Xana released her debut album, "Tantrums", on April 15, 2022. The album is autobiographical, reflecting on Xana's experiences in a toxic relationship. The title reflects how, through her music, Xana is "throwing tantrums so other people don't have to." There has been positive reception to the album, with Xtra Magazine citing the opening track as one of "the best queer songs of April" and "the perfect song to throw up two middle fingers to after the end of a relationship gone awry".

The songs "Yellow", "Kitchen Light", and "19" from "Tantrums", as well as the single "Tipsy", have music videos featuring the character Jodie, who is inspired by a woman with whom Xana had a relationship, and who was important to Xana's personal "life and "journey". Excluding "Tipsy", all the videos star Maia Cervillin as Jodie; the actor was changed after "Tipsy" due to the on-screen chemistry with Maia. The music video for "Kitchen Light" gained over one million views on YouTube.

In November 2022, Xana released an acoustic single, "bet you'll get off on this." The song was written over two days and recorded over three.

Artistry

Influences 
Xana has cited Avril Lavigne as her "first musical love" and inspiration at 6 years old, saying that "anti-pop very much formed the bones of my current sound. It allows the artist to branch out and can take so many different forms. I think that’s what makes it feel so authentic to the creator. I can experiment, try out different genres, themes and still sustain that anti-pop feel." She was inspired by Taylor Swift to write her own songs, and describes her and Halsey as among her biggest idols.

Themes 
Xana's music primarily revolves around themes of queer romance, as well as female empowerment and sexuality.

Personal life 
Xana identifies as queer and lesbian.

Discography

Albums

Singles

References 

Canadian lesbian musicians
Living people
21st-century Canadian LGBT people
21st-century Canadian women singers
Year of birth missing (living people)